Lucas Lund Pedersen (born 19 March 2000) is a Danish professional footballer who plays as a goalkeeper for Danish Superliga club Viborg. He is a Danish youth international.

Career
Born in Bruunshåb, Viborg Municipality, Pedersen joined the youth academy of Viborg FF at U12 level.

On 8 August 2018, Pedersen made his senior debut in the first round of the Danish Cup in a 10–0 away win over Vildbjerg SF.

Ahead of the 2019–20 season, he became the new starting goalkeeper for the club. He made his league debut on 26 July 2019 in a 3–0 home win over Roskilde, where he delivered a Man of the Match performance.

Being part of the Viborg-team winning promotion to the Danish Superliga in the 2020–21 season, Pedersen made his debut at the highest level on 18 July 2021 in a 2–1 away win over Nordsjælland.

Career statistics

Club

Honours
Viborg
Danish 1st Division: 2020–21

References

External links
 
 

2000 births
Living people
Danish men's footballers
Denmark youth international footballers
Association football goalkeepers
Viborg FF players
Danish 1st Division players
Danish Superliga players
People from Viborg Municipality
Sportspeople from the Central Denmark Region